Deportivo Alavés B, S.A.D., usually known as Alavés B, is a Spanish football team based in Vitoria-Gasteiz, in the autonomous community of Basque Country. Founded in 1959 it is the reserve team of Deportivo Alavés, and currently plays in Segunda Federación – Group 2, holding home matches at Instalaciones de Ibaia-José Luis Compañon, the club's training facilities with 2,500 seat-capacity.

The team's home kit is blue and white-striped shirt, blue shorts and white socks.

League history
The league placings have largely mirrored the fortunes of the senior team. From their formation in the 1960s until the late 1990s, Alavés B competed only in the fourth (Tercera Grupo IV) or fifth (Preferente de Álava) tiers. They achieved promotion to Segunda División B in 1999, a year after the seniors climbed to La Liga. Alavés B remained in the third level for seven seasons, usually finishing mid-table, until demotion in 2005-06, the same year that the main side was relegated amid economic turmoil under Dmitry Piterman.

During the 2000s, Alavés B practically not contributed players to the Alavés first team, which has been almost exclusively nourished by foreign signings, and the decline of the club continued when the senior side themselves dropped into Segunda División B in 2009, while the B team were relegated back down to the fifth level. It took Alavés B only two seasons to regain fourth-level status whereas the seniors took four years to rise again to the second level, but they then gained promotion to La Liga after three further seasons while the B team stayed put in Tercera División from that point on; they eventually gained promotion in 2018–19 via the playoffs.

Season to season 
As a farm team

 As a reserve team

8 seasons in Segunda División B
1 season in Segunda Federación
20 seasons in Tercera División
1 season in Tercera División RFEF

Current squad
.

Reserve team

Out on loan

Honours
Tercera División
Champions (1): 2016–17
RFEF Basque tournament
Winners (3): 2015–16, 2016–17, 2017–18

Notable players

 Ángel
 Javier Carpio
 Juan Pablo Colinas
 Óscar de Marcos
 Iñaki Garmendia
 Sergio Llamas
 Juan Cruz Ochoa
 Andrea Orlandi
 Rubén Pérez
 Sergio Pérez
 Nacho Rodríguez
 Asier Salcedo
 Josu Sarriegi
 Fernando Seoane
 Gaizka Toquero
 Mikel Vesga

References

External links
Official website 
Futbolme team profile 
Terra club info  

Association football clubs established in 1960
 
Spanish reserve football teams
1960 establishments in Spain
Football clubs in the Basque Country (autonomous community)